Calathus korax is a species of ground beetle from the Platyninae subfamily that is endemic to Greece.

References

korax
Beetles described in 1889
Endemic fauna of Greece
Beetles of Europe